Godwin Adikah (born 20 November 1997) is a Ghanaian footballer who currently plays as a defender for Ghana Premier League side Cape Coast Ebusua Dwarfs.

Career 
Born in Tema, Adikah started his football career with playing for colts clubs Unique FC and Charity FC. He subsequently played for lower tier sides Miracle Lands FC, Adenta FC and 14 Spartans FC, where his performance attracted teams in the Ghana Premier League including Ebusua Dwarfs who he joined in 2020.

Adikah joined Ghana Premier League side Ebusua Dwarfs in April 2020 ahead of the 2020–21 season. He made his debut on 20 November 2020 on his 23rd birthday, playing the full 90 minutes in a 2–0 loss to Eleven Wonders. After missing the first league match, he went on to play in the following 16 league matches in the first round of the season, starting in 14 of them. During the second round, he got injured and missed out on majority of the remaining matches. He however ended his debut season with 20 league appearances.

References

External links 
  

Living people
1997 births
Association football defenders
Ghanaian footballers
Ebusua Dwarfs players
Ghana Premier League players